The 17th Annual CableACE Awards were held on December 6, 1995. Below are the nominees and winners from that ceremony in the major categories.

Winners and nominees 
Winners in bold.

Movie or Miniseries 
 Citizen X (HBO)
 The Burning Season (HBO)
 Choices of the Heart: The Margaret Sanger Story (Lifetime)
 Indictment: The McMartin Trial (HBO)
 Kingfish: A Story of Huey P. Long (TNT)

Actor in a Movie or Miniseries 
 Raúl Juliá – The Burning Season (HBO)
 John Goodman – Kingfish: A Story of Huey P. Long (TNT)
 Tommy Lee Jones – The Good Old Boys (TNT)
 Raúl Juliá – Down Came a Blackbird (Showtime)
 James Woods – Indictment: The McMartin Trial (HBO)

Actress in a Movie or Miniseries 
 Linda Hamilton – A Mother's Prayer (USA)
 Laura Dern – Down Came a Blackbird (Showtime)
 Marlee Matlin – Against Her Will: The Carrie Buck Story (Lifetime)
 Vanessa Redgrave – Down Came a Blackbird (Showtime)
 Mercedes Ruehl – Indictment: The McMartin Trial (HBO)

Supporting Actor in a Movie or Miniseries 
 Jeffrey DeMunn – Citizen X (HBO)
 Robert Carlyle – Cracker (Episode: "To Be a Somebody") (A&E)
 Tony Haygarth – The Infiltrator (HBO)
 Ben Kingsley – Joseph (TNT)
 Max Von Sydow – Citizen X (HBO)

Supporting Actress in a Movie or Miniseries 
 Jean Marsh – Fatherland (HBO)
 Lolita Davidovich – Indictment: The McMartin Trial (HBO)
 Shirley Knight – Indictment: The McMartin Trial (HBO)
 Kay Lenz – Shame II: The Secret (Lifetime)
 Diana Rigg – Screen Two (Episode: "Genghis Cohn") (A&E)

Directing a Movie or Miniseries 
 John Frankenheimer – The Burning Season (HBO)
 Tim Fywell – Cracker (Episode: "To Be a Somebody") (A&E)
 Chris Gerolmo – Citizen X (HBO)
 Mick Jackson – Indictment: The McMartin Trial (HBO)
 Jean Stewart – Cracker (Episode: "Men Should Weep") (A&E)

Writing for a Movie or Miniseries 
 Stanley Price – Screen Two (Episode: "Genghis Cohn") (A&E)
 Joseph Dougherty – Witch Hunt (HBO)
 Chris Gerolmo – Citizen X (HBO)
 John Hopkins and Toshiro Ishido – Hiroshima (Showtime)
 Jimmy McGovern – Cracker (Episode: "To Be a Somebody") (A&E)

Comedy Series 
 The Larry Sanders Show (HBO)
 Dream On (HBO)
 Exit 57 (Comedy Central)
 The State (MTV)

Actor in a Comedy Series 
 Garry Shandling – The Larry Sanders Show (HBO)
 Brian Benben – Dream On (HBO)
 Howie Mandel – Howie Mandel's Sunny Skies (Showtime)
 Jeffrey Tambor – The Larry Sanders Show (HBO)
 Rip Torn – The Larry Sanders Show (HBO)

Actress in a Comedy Series 
 Wendie Malick – Dream On (HBO)
 Denny Dillon – Dream On (HBO)
 Janeane Garofalo – The Larry Sanders Show (HBO)
 Jodi Lennon – Exit 57 (Comedy Central)
 Amy Sedaris – Exit 57 (Comedy Central)

Directing a Comedy Series 
 Todd Holland – The Larry Sanders Show (Episode: "Doubt of the Benefit") (HBO)
 Robby Benson – Dream On (Episode: "Try Not to Remember") (HBO)
 Robert Ginty – Dream On (Episode: "Bess, You Is Not My Woman Now") (HBO)
 John Landis – Dream On (Episode: "The Courtship of Martin's Father") (HBO)
 Alan Myerson – The Larry Sanders Show (Episode: "Arthur's Crisis") (HBO)

Writing a Comedy Series 
 Drake Sather, Garry Shandling, and Peter Tolan – The Larry Sanders Show (Episode: "Doubt of the Benefit") (HBO)
 H. Jon Benjamin, Loren Bouchard, Bill Braudis, Dom Irrera, Jonathan Katz, Karen LeBlanc, Annette LeBlanc Cate, Will Lebow, Richard Luongo, Andre Lyman, Julianne Shapiro, Laura Silverman, Tom Snyder, and Mark Usher – Dr. Katz, Professional Therapist (Comedy Central)
 Maya Forbes – The Larry Sanders Show (Episode: "The Fourteenth Floor") (HBO)
 Maya Forbes, Steve Levitan, and Garry Shandling – The Larry Sanders Show (Episode: "Roseanne's Return") (HBO)
 Paul Simms – The Larry Sanders Show (Episode: "Hank's Divorce") (HBO)

Dramatic Series 
 The Outer Limits (Showtime)
 Avonlea (Disney Channel)
 Tales From the Crypt (HBO)
 The Showtime 30-Minute Movie (Showtime)

Dramatic or Theatrical Special 
 Cosmic Slop (Episode: "Space Traders") (HBO)
 Cosmic Slop (Episode: "Tang") (HBO)
 Cosmic Slop (Episode: "The First Commandment") (HBO)
 Tokyo Bound (International Channel)

Actor in a Dramatic Special or Series 
 John Hurt – Picture Windows (Episode: "Two Nudes Bathing") (Showtime)
 Beau Bridges – The Outer Limits (Episode: "The Sandkings") (Showtime)
 Larry Drake – The Outer Limits (Episode: "The Message") (Showtime)
 Kiefer Sutherland – Fallen Angels (Episode: "Love and Blood") (Showtime)
 Jim True – The Showtime 30-Minute Movie (Episode: "Two Over Easy") (Showtime)

Actress in a Dramatic Special or Series 
 Paula Jai Parker – Cosmic Slop (Episode: "Tang") (HBO)
 Jackie Burroughs – Avonlea (Disney Channel)
 Jennifer Grey – Fallen Angels (Episode: "A Dime a Dance") (Showtime)
 Isabella Rossellini – Tales From the Crypt (Episode: "You, Murderer") (HBO)
 Helen Shaver – The Outer Limits (Episode: "The Sandkings") (Showtime)

Directing a Dramatic Special or Series 
 Stuart Gillard – The Outer Limits (Episode: "The Sandkings") (Showtime)
 Jim McBride – Fallen Angels (Episode: "Fearless") (Showtime)
 Patricia Resnick – The Showtime 30-Minute Movie (Episode: "Grandpa's Funeral") (Showtime)
 Steven Soderbergh – Fallen Angels (Episode: "Professional Man") (Showtime)
 Robert Zemeckis – Tales From the Crypt (Episode: "You, Murderer") (HBO)

Writing a Dramatic Special or Series 
 Patricia Resnick – The Showtime 30-Minute Movie (Episode: "Grandpa's Funeral") (Showtime)
 John Boorman – Picture Windows (Episode: "Two Nudes Bathing") (Showtime)
 Trey Ellis – Cosmic Slop (Episode: "Space Traders") (HBO)
 Ted Henning and Stephen Kay – The Showtime 30-Minute Movie (Episode: "Two Over Easy") (Showtime)
 Frank Pugliese – Fallen Angels (Episode: "Love and Blood") (Showtime)

Animated Special or Series 
 Dr. Katz, Professional Therapist (Comedy Central)
 Duckman (USA)
 Rocko's Modern Life (Nickelodeon)
 Rugrats (Nickelodeon)

Comedy Special 
 HBO Comedy Hour (Episode: "Kathy & Mo: The Dark Side") (HBO)
 South Bank Show (Episode: "British Comedy Special") (Bravo)
 South Bank Show (Episode: "Dawn French and Large Women") (Bravo)
 South Bank Show (Episode: "Lenny Henry: African-American Humor") (Bravo)
 State of the Union: Undressed (Comedy Central)

Standup Comedy Special or Series 
 Full Frontal Comedy (Showtime)
 A&E's An Evening at the Improv (A&E)
 HBO Comedy Hour (Episode: "Rosie O'Donnell") (HBO)
 HBO Comedy Hour (Episode: "Women of the Night IV Hosted by Tracey Ullman") (HBO)
 The Mommies: My Kid Beat Up Your Honor Student (Showtime)

Performance in a Comedy Special 
 Mo Gaffney and Kathy Najimy – HBO Comedy Hour (Episode: "Kathy & Mo: The Dark Side") (HBO)
 Danny Bonaduce, Franklin Cover, Frank Gorshin, Robert Hegyes, Sherman Hemsley, Lawrence Hilton-Jacobs, Shirley Jones, Dave Madden, Ron Palillo, Isabel Sanford, and Adam West – 1995 MTV Movie Awards (MTV)
 Karen Hines – Married Life (Comedy Central)
 Dennis Miller – State of the Union: Undressed (Comedy Central)

Directing a Comedy Special 
 Anthony Morina – The Clinic (Comedy Central)
 Ken Finkleman – Married Life (Comedy Central)
 Vince Paterson – In Search of Dr. Seuss (TNT)

News Special or Series 
 Rwanda: Cry Justice (CNN International)
 CNN Presents (Episode: "America Mourns") (CNN)
 CNN Presents (Episode: "Kingdom of Cocaine") (CNN)
 New Religions: The Cult Question (MTV)
 Vietnam: Coming to Terms (CNN)

Talk Show Series 
 Politically Incorrect with Bill Maher (Comedy Central)
 Ask E. Jean (America's Talking)
 Charles Grodin (CNBC)
 Four on the Floor (VH1)
 Inside the Actors Studio (Bravo)

Documentary Series 
 Desmond Morris' The Human Animal (TLC)
 20th Century (A&E)
 A Baby's World (TLC)
 Biography (A&E)
 VH1 to 1 (VH1)

Entertainment Host 
 Garry Shandling – HBO Comedy Hour (Episode: "The 1995 Young Comedians Special") (HBO)
 Bobby Collins – Stand Up Spotlight (VH1)
 John Henson – Talk Soup (E!)
 Bill Maher – Politically Incorrect with Bill Maher (Comedy Central)
 Dennis Miller – Dennis Miller Live (HBO)

Writing an Entertainment Special 
 Jeff Cesario, Ed Driscoll, David Feldman, Eddie Feldmann, Greg Greenburg, and Kevin Rooney – Dennis Miller Live (Episode: "America: Where Did Our Sense of Humor Go?") (HBO)
 Trace Beaulieu, Paul Chaplin, Jim Mallon, Kevin Murphy, Michael J. Nelson, Mary Jo Pehl – The MST3K Little Gold Statue Preview Special (Comedy Central)
 Rosie O'Donnell – HBO Comedy Hour (Episode: "Rosie O'Donnell") (HBO)
 Marilyn Kentz and Caryl Kristensen – The Mommies: My Kid Beat Up Your Honor Student (Showtime)
 Rita Rudner – HBO Comedy Hour (Episode: "Rita Rudner: Married Without Children") (HBO)

Program Interviewer 
 Jane Wallace – Under Scrutiny with Jane Wallace (FX)
 Larry King – Larry King Live (CNN)
 Cal Thomas – Cal Thomas (CNBC)

Sports Information Series 
 MTV Sports (MTV)
 Inside the NFL (HBO)
 The Sporting Life With Jim Huber (CNN)
 The Sports Reporters (ESPN)
 Up Close: Primetime (ESPN)

Sports Host 
 Keith Olbermann – SportsCenter (ESPN)
 Chris Berman (ESPN)
 Jim Lampley (HBO)
 Dan Patrick (ESPN)
 Al Trautwig (Madison Square Garden Network)

Sports Commentator/Analyst 
 Dick Schaap – The Sports Reporters (ESPN)
 Doug Collins (TNT)
 Peter Gammons (ESPN)
 Dick Vitale (ESPN)

References 

17th CableACE Awards
1995 television awards